Tarma District is one of nine districts of the province Tarma in Peru.

The archaeological site Tarmatampu is situated in the district.

Geography 
Some of the highest mountains of the district are listed below:

Images

References